The 2015 Women's Ice Hockey World Championships were the 17th such series of tournaments organised by the International Ice Hockey Federation. These championships also served as qualifications for the 2016 competition.

Championship (Top Division)

The Top Division tournament was contested between eight teams from 28 March to 4 April 2015 in Malmö, Sweden.

Division I

Division I Group A
The Division I Group A tournament was played in Rouen, France, from 12 to 18 April 2015.

Division I Group B
The Division I Group B tournament was played in Beijing, China, from 6 to 12 April 2015.

Division II

Division II Group A
The Division II Group A tournament was played in Dumfries, Great Britain, from 30 March to 5 April 2015.

Division II Group B
The Division II Group B tournament was played in Jaca, Spain, from 7 to 13 March 2015.

Division II Group B Qualification
The Division II Group B Qualification tournament was played in Hong Kong, from 18 to 21 February 2015.

References

External links
Official website of IIHF

2015 IIHF Women's World Championship
IIHF Women's World Ice Hockey Championships
World